"What It Takes" is a power ballad by American band Aerosmith. Written by Steven Tyler, Joe Perry, and Desmond Child, it was released in 1989 as the third single from the critically and commercially successful 1989 album Pump. "I'll put some ballads on an album," Tyler remarked, "if that's what it takes so that some young kid can get to hear a 'Young Lust' or 'F.I.N.E.*'."

Background
Child had co-written the power ballad "Angel" for Aerosmith's previous album, but the band wanted to make sure that its own identity was reflected in "What It Takes." According to Perry "It started off sounding really county-western.  We didn't want to write a song like ‘Angel,’ and for Desmond, that's where his heart and soul is. He's into big, dramatic ballads. But we wanted to do something different.”  Aerosmith guitarist Brad Whitford stated that "It was a keyboard song to begin with. Somewhere along the line we knew it was special, so it had to be approached in a different manner.”  Perry went on to say that "The thing that made it for me was when [Fairbairn] put an accordion on it. That gave it the flavor it needed. Otherwise it would have just been nice chords and nice changes.”

Lyrics and music
The lyrics to "What It Takes" are about getting over a past relationship and the resulting hurt feelings.

Music video
There are two videos for the song.  One, directed by Wayne Isham, features the band performing in the Longhorn Ballroom.  The other, directed by Keith Garde and Martin Torgoff, is culled from scenes from The Making of Pump, a film which documented the recording process of the Pump album.  The latter received much greater airplay, and was also the version the band chose to include on their video collection Big Ones You Can Look At.

Charts

Year-end charts

References

Aerosmith songs
1989 songs
1989 singles
1990 singles
Country music songs
Songs written by Desmond Child
Songs written by Steven Tyler
Songs written by Joe Perry (musician)
Song recordings produced by Bruce Fairbairn
Geffen Records singles
1980s ballads
Country ballads
Glam metal ballads
Glam metal songs